Yuanotherium minor is an extinct species of cynodonts which existed in China during the Late Jurassic epoch, described from the Shishugou Formation. It is the only species in the genus Yuanotherium.

References

Tritylodontids
Prehistoric cynodont genera
Oxfordian genera
Late Jurassic synapsids of Asia
Jurassic China
Fossils of China
Fossil taxa described in 2009